Toyohiko is a masculine Japanese given name.

Possible writings
Toyohiko can be written using different combinations of kanji characters. Here are some examples:

登代彦, "climb up, generation, elegant boy"
豊彦, "bountiful, elegant boy"
豊比古, "bountiful, young man (archaic)"

The name can also be written in hiragana とよひこ or katakana トヨヒコ.

Notable people with the name
, Japanese handball player.
, Japanese Christian pacifist, reformer and labor activist.
, Japanese lutenist and composer.

Japanese masculine given names